Echeverri may refer to:

Surname
Echeverri, Echeverry or Echeberri is a surname of Basque origin, spelled Etxeberri in that language, and with a presence in Spanish and French speaking countries.

Notable people
 Andrea Echeverri (born 1965), Colombian pop singer
 Carlos Echeverri Cortés (1900–1974), Colombian economist and diplomat
 Diego Echeverri (born 1989), Colombian footballer
 Fernando Martínez de Espinosa y Echeverri (fl. 1896), Spanish admiral
 Gilberto Echeverri Mejia (born 1936), Colombian politician and peace advocate
 Hector Echeverri (1938–1988), Colombian footballer
 Isabella Echeverri (born 1994), Colombian footballer
 Juan Carlos Echeverry
 Juan Carlos Echeverry (born 1962), Colombian economist and current president of Ecopetrol
 Juan Carlos Echeverry, Colombian operatic tenor
 Luis Carlos Villegas Echeverri (born 1957), Colombian politician
 Rodrigo Londoño Echeverri (born 1959), Colombian politician and ex-guerilla
 Tatiana Echeverri Fernandez (born 1974), Costa Rican artist

See also
 Etcheverry (disambiguation)
 Etxeberria, a Basque language placename and surname